St. Paul's Episcopal Church in Evanston, Wyoming is a small church in the Carpenter Gothic style. The church was built in 1884–1885, and at the time was the only Protestant church in a community dominated by Mormons and Catholics. In its early history it hosted Lutherans, Methodists and Presbyterians in addition to its Episcopalian congregation.

The simple plan features a nave entered from a side narthex, with an apse set apart from the nave by a Gothic arch. The windows are pointed arches with quatrefoils. Construction is wood frame with drop or beveled siding. The detailing is principally plain flat material, with some evidence of Stick Style influence.

St. Paul's Episcopal Church was listed on the National Register of Historic Places in 1980.

References

External links
 St. Paul's Episcopal Church at the Wyoming State Historic Preservation Office

Churches on the National Register of Historic Places in Wyoming
Churches completed in 1885
19th-century Episcopal church buildings
Buildings and structures in Uinta County, Wyoming
Carpenter Gothic church buildings in Wyoming
National Register of Historic Places in Uinta County, Wyoming
Evanston, Wyoming